Rosamund Bartlett is a British writer, scholar,   lecturer, and translator specializing in Russian literature.

Bartlett graduated from Durham University with a first-class degree in Russian. She went on to complete a doctorate at Oxford.

Rosamund Bartlett is the author of Tolstoy: A Russian Life (2010) and has translated Leo Tolstoy's Anna Karenina (2014).  She is also the author of Chekhov: Scenes from a Life (2004) and has translated two volumes of Anton Chekhov's short stories.

As a translator, she published the first unexpurgated edition of Anton Chekhov's letters, and she was awarded the Chekhov 150th Anniversary Medal in 2010 by the Russian government for work her Chekhov Foundation has done in preserving the White Dacha, the writer's house in Yalta.

Selected works
 Tolstoy: A Russian Life
 Chekhov: Scenes from a Life
 Literary Russia: A Guide (co-authored with Anna Benn)
 Victory Over the Sun: The World's First Futurist Opera (co-edited with Sarah Dadswell)
 Shostakovich in Context (editor)
 Wagner and Russia (Cambridge Studies in Russian Literature)

As translator
 Anna Karenina by Leo Tolstoy for Oxford World's Classics
 About Love and Other Stories by Anton Chekhov for Oxford World's Classics
 A Life in Letters, by Anton Chekhov for Penguin Classics (co-translator: Anthony Phillips)
 The Exclamation Mark, by Anton Chekhov for Hesperus Classics
 The Talisman and Other Tales by Viktoria Tokareva

References

External links



Living people
American biographers
American women biographers
American translators
Alumni of St Cuthbert's Society, Durham
Alumni of the University of Oxford
Year of birth missing (living people)
21st-century American women